Frank Rudolph Crosswaith (1892–1965) was a longtime socialist politician and activist and trade union organizer in New York City who founded and chaired the Negro Labor Committee, established on July 20, 1935 by the Negro Labor Conference.

Background
Frank R. Crosswaith was born on July 16, 1892 in Frederiksted, St. Croix, Danish West Indies (the island was sold to the United States in 1917 and became part of the U.S. Virgin Islands).  His parents were William I. Crosswaith and Anne Eliza Crosswaith.  He emigrated to the United States in his teens. While finishing high school, he worked as an elevator operator, porter and garment worker. He joined the elevator operators' union and when he finished high school, he won a scholarship from the socialist The Jewish Daily Forward to attend the Rand School of Social Science, an educational institute in New York City associated with the Socialist Party of America.

Career
Crosswaith founded an organization called the Trade Union Committee for Organizing Negro Workers in 1925, but this work went by the wayside when Crosswaith accepted a position as an organizer for the fledgling Brotherhood of Sleeping Car Porters. Crosswaith maintained a long association with union head A. Philip Randolph, serving with him as officers of the Negro Labor Committee in the 1930s and 1940s.

In the early 1930s Crosswaith worked as an organizer for the International Ladies Garment Workers Union, which became one of the major supporters of the Negro Labor Committee.

Political career

In 1924, he ran on the Socialist ticket for Secretary of State of New York, and in 1936 for Congressman-at-large. He ran also for the New York City Council in 1939 on the American Labor ticket.

Crosswaith was elected to the governing executive committee of the American Labor Party in New York in 1924.

In 1934, Crosswaith co-founded and chaired the Harlem Labor Committee (HLC), which he tried to align with the American Federation of Labor (AFL), then seeking African American members.

Labor career

Crosswaith was an anti-communist and believed that the best hope for black workers in the United States was to join bona fide labor unions just as the best hope for the American labor movement was to welcome black workers into unions in order to promote solidarity and eliminate the use of black workers as strike breakers. He believed strongly that "separation of workers by race would only work to undermine the strength of the entire labor movement." Crosswaith spent much of his energy in the late 1930s and early 1940s battling a rival labor organization called the Harlem Labor Union, Inc., which was run by Ira Kemp and had a black nationalist philosophy. He accused Kemp of undermining the interests of black workers by signing agreements with employers that offered them labor at wages below union rates.

Crosswaith also worked with A. Philip Randolph during World War II in organizing the March on Washington Movement, which was called off when President Franklin D. Roosevelt agreed to sign Executive Order 8802, which prohibited racial discrimination in defense industries.

Death

Frank R. Crosswaith died in 1965.

Legacy

Crosswaith was known as the "Negro Debs" (after Eugene V. Debs).

"Crosswaith, a Socialist, sought to ally African American workers with white workers under the banner of class. Thus, he opposed African American leaders who believed in racial alliance alone."

Additional information on Crosswaith may be found in the Negro Labor Committee Records held by the Schomburg Center for Research in Black Culture in New York City.

Works
 True Freedom for Negro and White Labor with Alfred Baker Lewis and Norman Thomas (1936)
 Negro and White Labor Unite for True Freedom with Alfred Baker Lewis (1942)

References

External links
 Cornelius L. Bynum, "The New Negro and Social Democracy during the Harlem Renaissance, 1917-37," Journal of the Gilded Age and Progressive Era, vol. 10, no. 1 (Jan. 2011), pp. 89–112. In JSTOR
 Irwin M. Marcus, "Frank Crosswaith: Black Socialist, Labor Leader, and Reformer," Negro History Bulletin, vol. 37 (1974), pp. 287–288.
 John Howard Seabrook, Black and White Unite: The Career of Frank R. Crosswaith. PhD dissertation. Rutgers University, 1980.
 John C. Walter, "Frank R. Crosswaith and the Negro Labor Committee in Harlem, 1925-1939," Afro-Americans in New York Life and History, Vol. 3, No. 2 (July, 1979), pp. 35–49.
A Soldier of Black Labor - Frank Crosswaith

1892 births
1965 deaths
Socialist Party of America politicians from New York (state)
People from Saint Croix, U.S. Virgin Islands
American people of United States Virgin Islands descent
International Ladies Garment Workers Union leaders
American Labor Party politicians
African-American trade unionists
20th-century African-American people